Ellen Brown Lake is a lake of Pictou County, in Nova Scotia, Canada.

Ellen Brown Lake is in the headwaters of the West Branch of St. Mary's River.
The lake lies just north of the Nelson River, a tributary of the St. Mary's.
Environment Canada collected water quality data in the lake in 1997.
Selected findings were alkalinity 2 mg/L CaCO3, pH 6.29, total nitrogen 0.112 mg/L and total phosphorus 0.0049 mg/L.

See also
List of lakes in Nova Scotia

References

Sources

Lakes of Nova Scotia